Frogeye salad (also frog-eye salad or frog's eye salad alternatively fish-eye salad or fish's eye salad) is a type of sweet pasta salad (dessert salad) made with small, round acini di pepe pasta, whipped topping, and egg yolks.  Fruit, such as mandarin oranges and pineapples, are often mixed in, and it is sometimes topped with marshmallows, all of which contribute to the sweetness while adding variety. The humorous name refers to the pasta looking like frog's eyes. 

The salad has a strong regional presence in Idaho and Utah and surrounding states (the Mormon Corridor), especially among members of the Church of Jesus Christ of Latter-day Saints.

See also
Rice pudding
Tapioca pudding
List of salads
Fruit salad
Jello salad
Seafoam salad

References

Utah cuisine
Fruit salads
Fruit dishes
Pasta dishes
Idaho culture
Sweet salads
American salads